Bocholt may refer to:

 Bocholt, Germany, a city in the state of North Rhine-Westphalia
 Bocholt, Belgium, a municipality in the province of Limburg